Vito Antuofermo (born February 9, 1953) is an Italian American actor and retired professional boxer. He is a former undisputed World Middleweight Champion.

Background 
His family moved to the United States when he was 17 years old. Antuofermo learned how to fight in the tough areas of New York City. By his teens, he had made up his mind that he wanted to be a professional boxer.

He has lived in Howard Beach, Queens.

Amateur career 
Antuofermo won the 1970  New York Golden Gloves Championship, defeating Thomas Chestnut in the finals. In 1971, Antuofermo was defeated by future Light Heavyweight Champion Eddie Gregory in the finals of the  Open division. Antuofermo trained at the Police Athletic Leagues Sweeney Center in Brooklyn, New York.

Professional career
Antuofermo had a propensity to cut easily, especially around the eyebrows. In between rounds in his fights, as much attention (if not more) was given to Vito patching up cuts on his face as it was giving him advice and instructions.

In 1979, Antuofermo became World Middleweight Champion by beating defending champion Hugo Corro by a decision in 15 rounds at Monte Carlo. According to an article in The Ring, Howard Cosell, who was working on that fight's live broadcast to the US, was telling viewers that Corro was, in his opinion, way ahead on the judges' cards. When someone on the American television crew found out it was Antuofermo who was actually leading on the cards, Cosell then began to say he had Antuofermo ahead.  All three judges' scorecards were very close, each showing a tight, one-point margin: 143–142, and 146–145 in Antuofermo's favor and 146–145 in Corro's favor.

On the morning after winning the title, Antuofermo and his crew were driving to a small vacation in Italy, when he saw a car fly off a bridge under which they were passing. The car landed right in front of his, but luckily the accident did not injure any occupants in Antuofermo's car. He was so shocked that he kept driving and never found out what happened to the occupants of that car. He came back to his senses about 20 minutes later.

On November 30, 1979, Antuofermo defended his title against Marvelous Marvin Hagler in Las Vegas, Nevada, the fight resulting in a controversial 15-round draw. Judge Duane Ford scored the bout in Hagler's favor, 145–141.  Judge Dalby Shirley scored it for Antuofermo, 144–142.  Judge Hal Miller had it even at 143–143.  The draw enabled Antuofermo to retain his title.  In his next defense, against Alan Minter, also in Las Vegas, he lost the title by a 15-round split decision. The bout featured a wild disparity in scoring with a Venezuelan judge scoring the fight for Antuofermo while a British judge had Minter winning 13 of the 15 rounds.  They had a rematch in London on June 28, 1980. Minter retained the crown by a TKO (on cuts) in eight rounds.

Antuofermo kept fighting and winning and, after Hagler won the title from Minter in 1980, Antuofermo was given another chance to regain the World Middleweight Championship. In front of an HBO Boxing audience and a full house at Hagler's native Boston's Boston Garden, Antuofermo this time lost by a TKO on cuts in the fourth round.

After several attempts at becoming a top middleweight again, Antuofermo retired from boxing in 1985.

Apart from Corro, other boxers he beat included world champions Eckhard Dagge, Denny Moyer and Emile Griffith.

In 1992, Michael Franzese, a Caporegime of the Colombo crime family, testified that Antoufermo had been under the control of mobsters including Andy Russo. Franzese stated that the outcome of many of Antuofermo's fights were pre-determined so that organized crime figures could safely bet, but that the fights with Marvelous Marvin Hagler were not fixed.

Life after boxing 
After retirement, Antuofermo began to pursue an acting career. In 1990, he landed a small role in The Godfather Part III as the chief bodyguard of gangster Joey Zasa. He has landed several small speaking roles in movies and television shows since, including the critically acclaimed television show The Sopranos as a mobster. He has also done many theater plays.

Antuofermo also made television commercials for Old Spice deodorant.

Antuofermo's record reads 50 wins, 7 losses and 2 draws, with 21 wins by knockout. Vito Antuofermo's second oldest son, Pasquale Antuofermo, boxed as an amateur, but never turned pro. He now owns a successful landscaping company that operates in Long Island, New York.

Filmography
1990: Goodfellas – Prizefighter
1990: The Godfather Part III – Anthony 'The Ant' Squigliaro
1991: Loser – Homeless Man
1993: New York Undercover – Jimmy
1996: The Mouse – Trainer
1998: Hell's Kitchen – Boyle's Thug
1999: La bomba – Pippo Messina
2000: The Boys Behind the Desk

Professional boxing record

See also
List of world middleweight boxing champions

References

External links

Vito Antuofermo - CBZ Profile

 

|-

|-

1953 births
Living people
Italian male boxers
Sportspeople from Bari
People of Apulian descent
Italian emigrants to the United States
American people of Italian descent
American male boxers
People from Howard Beach, Queens
Italian male film actors
Italian male television actors
European Boxing Union champions
World Boxing Association champions
World Boxing Council champions
The Ring (magazine) champions
Light-middleweight boxers
World middleweight boxing champions